Chaerophyllopsis huai is a species of flowering plant in the family Apiaceae, the only member of the genus Chaerophyllopsis. It is endemic to China.

References

Apioideae
Endemic flora of China
Monotypic Apioideae genera